Oualid Mhamdi (born 20 May 2003) is a professional footballer who plays as a right-back for the German club Greuther Fürth. Born in Germany, he is a youth international for Morocco.

Club career
Mhamdi is a youth product of SV Falke Bergrath, Alemannia Aachen, and Viktoria Köln. He made his professional debut as a last minute substitute with Viktoria Köln in a 2–0  loss to Borussia Dortmund II in the 3. Liga on 2 April 2022. He transferred to 2. Bundesliga side Greuther Fürth on 3 June 2022, signing a contract until 2025.

International career
Born in Germany, Mhamdi is of Moroccan descent. He played for the Morocco U20s in a set of matches in October 2022.

References

External links
 
 Bundesliga profile
 DFB Profile

2003 births
Living people
People from Eschweiler
Moroccan footballers
Morocco youth international footballers
German footballers
German people of Moroccan descent
FC Viktoria Köln players
SpVgg Greuther Fürth players
SpVgg Greuther Fürth II players
2. Bundesliga players
3. Liga players
Regionalliga players
Association football fullbacks